Yambol Peak is a rocky peak rising to 300 m in the south extremity of Friesland Ridge, Tangra Mountains on Livingston Island in the South Shetland Islands, Antarctica and overlooking Tarnovo Ice Piedmont to the west and Prespa Glacier to the northeast. A southeastern offshoot of the peak forms Gela Point. The feature is named after the Bulgarian town of Yambol.

Location

Maps
 L.L. Ivanov et al. Antarctica: Livingston Island and Greenwich Island, South Shetland Islands. Scale 1:100000 topographic map. Sofia: Antarctic Place-names Commission of Bulgaria, 2005.
 L.L. Ivanov. Antarctica: Livingston Island and Greenwich, Robert, Snow and Smith Islands. Scale 1:120000 topographic map. Troyan: Manfred Wörner Foundation, 2010.  (First edition 2009. )
 Antarctic Digital Database (ADD). Scale 1:250000 topographic map of Antarctica. Scientific Committee on Antarctic Research (SCAR). Since 1993, regularly updated.
 L.L. Ivanov. Antarctica: Livingston Island and Smith Island. Scale 1:100000 topographic map. Manfred Wörner Foundation, 2017.

Notes

References
 Yambol Peak. SCAR Composite Gazetteer of Antarctica
 Bulgarian Antarctic Gazetteer. Antarctic Place-names Commission. (details in Bulgarian, basic data in English)

External links
 Yambol Peak. Copernix satellite image

Tangra Mountains
Yambol